In Ohio, State Route 240 may refer to:
Ohio State Route 240 (1920s-1930s), now part of SR 348
Ohio State Route 240 (1940s-1960s), now part of SR 269